This is a list of the seasons played by Deportivo Toluca from 1950 when the club became a professional football club. Before 1950, and from 1917, when Deportivo Toluca was founded, the club participated in several amateur competitions.  Top scorers in bold were also top scorers of Liga MX.

Toluca has won the first division title ten times, the Copa MX twice, the Campeón de Campeones four times, the Segunda División de México once and the CONCACAF Champions' Cup twice.

Professional era (league system) (1950–1970)

Liguilla system (1970–1996)

Short tournaments (1996–present)

† The Clausura 2020 tournament was suspended due to the COVID-19 pandemic.

Notes

References